Eskini (also, Erskins and Es-kin) is a former Maidu settlement in Butte County, California. It lay at an elevation of 157 feet (48 m). Its location is now within the limits of Durham.

References

External links

Former settlements in Butte County, California
Former Native American populated places in California
Maidu villages